The 2020 Halifax municipal election was held on 17 October 2020 to elect councillors and a mayor to a four-year term on the Halifax Regional Council, the governing body of the Halifax Regional Municipality. Members of the Conseil scolaire acadien provincial were also elected. The election was held in conjunction with municipal elections across the province.

Of the 16 incumbent councillors, 11 ran for re-election. Of those, nine retained their seats. Mike Savage sought another term as mayor, competing for the position against incumbent councillor Matt Whitman and social media personality and copywriter Max Taylor. Savage was handily re-elected, capturing over 80 per cent of votes cast for the position.

A record number of women were elected, achieving gender parity on Halifax council for the first time.

Electoral system
Councillors (elected by residents of each of the 16 electoral districts) and the mayor (elected at-large by all voters) are chosen using the first-past-the-post voting system. Each district elects one councillor; the candidate with the most votes wins. There are no political parties at the municipal level in Nova Scotia.

The boundaries of the 16 districts, updated in 2015, were the same as those used in the 2016 election.

Synopsis

In the run-up to the election, four incumbent councillors declared their intentions to retire from municipal politics. In October 2019, longtime Spryfield councillor Steve Adams (District 11) announced that he would not re-offer in the following year's election. Adams was first elected in 1991. Veteran Dartmouth councillor Bill Karsten (District 3) announced in May 2020 that he would not run again. Lorelei Nicoll (District 4) and Russell Walker (District 10) followed suit in July 2020.

The first confirmed mayoral candidate was Matt Whitman, the incumbent councillor in District 13. Whitman announced his campaign at the Grand Parade in October 2019. Incumbent mayor Mike Savage announced his candidacy for re-election in March 2020. A third candidate, Max Taylor, joined the race in September 2020. Taylor's platform centred on encouraging Halifax residents to "get out and vote".

Local market research firm Narrative Research (formerly Corporate Research Associates) polled the public in August 2020 to gauge support for Savage and Whitman (Taylor had not yet nominated). Of the decided voters polled, 89 per cent stated that they would vote for Savage for mayor.

District 12 candidate Eric Jury attracted controversy after publishing a video in which he promised, if elected, to "bring any motion you want forward" on behalf of anyone who donated over $100 to his campaign. Jury's entry on the municipality's online list of candidates included a link to the video. Richard Zurawski, the incumbent councillor for District 12, stated that he was "absolutely floored" by the video, and expressed concern that municipal staff had apparently not vetted material posted to the elections website. The legality of Jury's proclamation was questioned. A city spokesperson responded, "the returning officer for the election has reached out to this candidate, and the video has been removed. No further action will be taken at this time." Jury received only two per cent of votes cast in the district, and was not elected.

Advance telephone and Internet polls ran from October 6 to 14. Advance in-person polls ran from October 10 to 13. The election was held on October 17.

Mike Savage was re-elected as mayor by a large margin, earning a greater share of votes (80 per cent) than in 2016 (68 per cent). A record number of women (eight) were elected, achieving gender parity on council for the first time in history. In contrast, only two women were elected in the 2016 election. Of the 11 incumbent councillors that ran for re-election, nine retained their seats while two (Steve Streatch and Richard Zurawski) did not.

The results for most districts were known by the end of election day, as the unofficial results provided a clear indication of the winning candidates. However, the race in District 11 was too close to call, as Patty Cuttell led Bruce Holland by a small margin and results from two polls had not been published. The results were issued the following afternoon, with Cuttell winning the race by 28 votes. The municipal returning officer attributed the delay to confusion surrounding the tallying of two advance polls, as well as a large number of new, inexperienced election staff. Holland requested an official recount, commenting that the number of spoiled and rejected ballots was greater than the 28 votes that won the race. On 28 October 2020, the judicial recount was officially ordered. The recount confirmed Cuttell's win.

Voter turnout increased over the previous election. In 2016, only 33.62 per cent of eligible residents voted. In 2020, approximately 39.65 per cent voted. A professor of political science at Cape Breton University commented that the ongoing COVID-19 pandemic may have prompted a stronger interest in community affairs. The pandemic may also have encouraged the use of e-voting.

The new council was sworn in on 29 October 2020 at the Halifax Convention Centre with the exception of Patty Cuttell, who had to await the results of the District 11 recount. Cuttell was sworn in on 10 November.

Candidates and results

Note: The figures below do not take into account spoiled or rejected ballots.

Mayor
Mike Savage was re-elected as mayor.

District 1: Waverley - Fall River - Musquodoboit Valley 
Cathy Deagle Gammon was elected, unseating incumbent Steve Streatch.

District 2: Preston - Chezzetcook - Eastern Shore 
Incumbent David Hendsbee was re-elected.

District 3: Dartmouth South - Eastern Passage 
Incumbent Bill Karsten did not re-offer. Becky Kent, who served as regional councillor for the former Woodside-Eastern Passage district from 2004 to 2007, was elected.

District 4: Cole Harbour - Westphal 
Incumbent Lorelei Nicoll did not re-offer. Trish Purdy was elected.

District 5: Dartmouth Centre 
Incumbent Sam Austin was re-elected.

District 6: Harbourview - Burnside - Dartmouth East 
Incumbent Tony Mancini was re-elected.

District 7: Halifax South Downtown 
Incumbent Waye Mason was re-elected.

District 8: Halifax Peninsula North 
Incumbent Lindell Smith was re-elected.

District 9: Halifax West Armdale 
Incumbent Shawn Cleary was re-elected.

District 10: Halifax - Bedford Basin West 
Incumbent Russell Walker did not re-offer. Kathryn Morse was elected.

District 11: Spryfield - Sambro Loop - Prospect Road 
Incumbent Steve Adams did not re-offer. Patty Cuttell was elected.

District 12: Timberlea - Beechville - Clayton Park - Wedgewood 
Iona Stoddard was elected, unseating incumbent Richard Zurawski.

District 13: Hammonds Plains - St. Margarets 
Incumbent councillor Matt Whitman did not re-offer as he ran for mayor. Candidates are not allowed to run for mayor and councillor at the same time. Pam Lovelace was elected.

District 14: Middle/Upper Sackville - Beaver Bank - Lucasville 
Incumbent Lisa Blackburn was re-elected.

District 15: Lower Sackville 
Incumbent Paul Russell was re-elected.

District 16: Bedford - Wentworth 
Incumbent Tim Outhit was re-elected by acclamation.

Conseil scolaire acadien provincial 
Three candidates for the Conseil scolaire acadien provincial were elected by acclamation, namely: Jeff Arsenault, Katherine Howlett, and Marc Pinet.

References

External links
 Municipal elections – Halifax government website

2020 elections in Canada
2020
2020 in Nova Scotia
October 2020 events in Canada